Just for Fun may refer to:

 Just for Fun (Timeflies album), a 2015 album by American pop duo Timeflies
 Just for Fun (Hank Jones album), a 1977 jazz album
 Just for Fun (book), the 2001 autobiography of Linux kernel creator Linus Torvalds.
 Just for Fun (film), a 1963 British musical
 Just for Fun (EP), a 1963 split EP by Bobby Vee and The Crickets
 Just for Fun (Canadian TV series), a Canadian children's game show, on air from 1975 to 1976

See also
 Just 4 Fun (disambiguation)